The Anglican St Mary's Church at Stringston in the English county of Somerset dates from the 17th century. It has been designated as a Grade II listed building.

The current building replaced an earlier one linked to Kilve Chantry. Although there is some 17th-century fabric left in the building, most of existing stonework is from the late 19th and early 20th century following a Victorian restoration. The three-stage west tower is supported by diagonal buttresses.

Within the churchyard is a cross dating from the 14th century, which is on the Heritage at Risk Register. It has two steps and an octagonal shaft supporting a canopied head. It is Grade II* listed and scheduled as an ancient monument. There is also a chest tomb surrounded by railing.

The parish is part of The Quantock Coast Benefice within the archdeaconry of Taunton.

See also  
 List of ecclesiastical parishes in the Diocese of Bath and Wells

References

Scheduled monuments in West Somerset
Grade II listed buildings in West Somerset
Grade II listed churches in Somerset